Beth Martinez Humenik is a Republican politician in the U.S. state of Colorado. She served one term in the Colorado State Senate from 2015 until 2019, representing District 24, which includes parts of Adams County.

Early life and education
A fourth-generation Coloradoan, Martinez Humenik grew up in Fort Collins and has lived in Thornton since 1997. She received a bachelor's degree and master's degree from Colorado State University.

Career
Marinez Humenik was formerly an adjunct instructor and substitute teacher.

Political career

Thorton City Council
Marinez Humenik was a member of the Thornton City Council from 2007 to 2015.

Martinez Humenik unsuccessfully ran for the state House in 2012, losing to Democrat Joe Salazar.

Colorado State Senate
Martinez Humenik was elected to the Colorado State Senate from District 24 in 2014. Martinez Humenik ran uncontested in the Republican primary election. She defeated Democrat Judy Solano in the general election, receiving 26,164 votes to Solano's 25,268 votes. The distinct encompasses parts of Adams County, specifically Westminster, Northglenn, and Thornton.

In the Senate, Martinez Humenik served as chair of the Health & Human Services committee and Local Government committee, and was vice chair of the Joint Technology Committee and Statutory Revision Committee. Martinez Humenik is considered fairly moderate by the standards of Colorado Republicans; in 2015, Martinez Humenik broke with the Republicans to defeat a key anti-abortion bill, joining Democrats in the Senate Health and Human Services Committee in voting against the legislation. The vote earned Martinez Humerik the enmity of Colorado anti-abortion activists.

Martinez Humenik was a member of the executive committee of the National Hispanic Caucus of State Legislators.

Candidacy for Mayor of Thornton
In September 2019, Martinez Humenik announced her candidacy for Mayor of Thornton. She came in third out of five candidates, winning 21.4% of the vote.

References

External links
Official mayoral campaign website
Official Legislature profile

Living people
Year of birth missing (living people)
American politicians of Mexican descent
Republican Party Colorado state senators
Women state legislators in Colorado
Colorado State University alumni
Hispanic and Latino American state legislators in Colorado
Hispanic and Latino American women in politics
People from Thornton, Colorado
21st-century American politicians
21st-century American women politicians